This is a list of writers on Sikhism. The list should include writers who have Wikipedia articles who have written books about Sikhism. Each entry should indicate the writers most well-known work. Multiple works should be listed only if each work has a Wikipedia article. 

 Bhai Vir Singh
 Bhagat Puran Singh
 Professor Puran Singh
 Randhir Singh
 Giani Sant Singh Maskeen
 Jaswant Singh Neki
 Max Arthur Macauliffe
 Rajkavi Inderjeet Singh Tulsi
 Karam Singh
 Bhai Kahn Singh
 G. B. Singh
 Khushwant Singh
 Gurbachan Singh Talib
 Gurinder Singh Mann
 Harjot Oberoi

See also
 List of modern Eastern religions writers

Lists of writers
List
Sikhism-related lists